Lockport Heights may refer to a place in the United States:

Lockport Heights, Illinois, a census-designated place
Lockport Heights, Louisiana, a census-designated place